Mirna Louisa-Godett (born 29 January 1954) is a Curaçaoan politician who served as the 25th Prime Minister of the Netherlands Antilles from 11 August 2003 until 3 June 2004.

Louisa-Godett became prime minister, following fraud allegations were made against her brother , leader of the Party Workers' Liberation Front 30 May (FOL),. Critics accused Louisa-Godett of being merely a puppet of her brother.

The Godett government collapsed in early 2004 over corruption allegations against justice minister Ben Komproe.

References 

1954 births
Living people
Curaçao women in politics
Party Workers' Liberation Front 30 May politicians
Prime Ministers of the Netherlands Antilles